Maipú is a central department of Chaco Province in Argentina.

The provincial subdivision has a population of about 25,000 inhabitants in an area of  2,855 km², and its capital city is Tres Isletas, which is located around 1,250 km from the Capital federal.

Settlements
Pampa Caba Naro
Pampa Florida
Tres Isletas

References

Departments of Chaco Province